The four Rs may refer to :

 some variants of The three Rs
 Reading, (W)Riting, (A)Rithmetic (or Reckoning), and Religion, in education
 Responsibility, Respect, Resourcefulness, Responsiveness (in the Individual Education school system)
 Reduce, reuse, recycle and repair, in sustainability
 rescue, rehabilitation, restoration, and reintegration.
 remove, raise, reduce and reward, A YouTube campaign that approach to responsibility for its content.